Martina Castells Ballespí also known as Martina Castells i Ballespí (1852-1884), was one of the first Spanish women to earn a PhD in medicine. She earned a Bachelor of Arts in 1874, and earned her PhD in 1882. In her thesis she supported physical, moral and intellectual education for women.

In Lleida there is a street called Martina Castells Ballespí, where a bust of her can be seen, and in Reus, an avenue is named after her.

Further reading
 Corbella, Jacinto, and Domenech, Edelmira.  "A question of priority: Helena Maseras, Dolors Aleu, Martina Castells," in Proceedings of the First International Congress of the History of Catalan Medicine (Montpellier), 1970, vol.  I, pp. 139–142.

References

1852 births
1884 deaths
19th-century Spanish physicians
Spanish women physicians
19th-century women physicians